Jeffrey Messenger (born November 28, 1949) is an American politician. He is a former member of the Missouri House of Representatives from the 130th district from 2013 to 2021. He is a member of the Republican party.

References

Living people
Republican Party members of the Missouri House of Representatives
1949 births
21st-century American politicians
People from Scott County, Kansas
People from Republic, Missouri